Linda Vissers (born February 5, 1961) is a member of the Flemish Parliament from the right-wing, separatist Vlaams Belang party of Belgium.

References

Living people
Members of the Flemish Parliament
1961 births
Place of birth missing (living people)
21st-century Belgian politicians
21st-century Belgian women politicians
Vlaams Belang politicians